Madagascar–Turkey relations are the foreign relations between Madagascar and Turkey.
Turkey has an embassy in Antananarivo since April 21, 2010. Madagascar is accredited to Turkey from its embassy in Rome, Italy. Madagascar also has an honorary consulate in Istanbul.

Diplomatic relations 
Madagascar–Turkey relations were generally warm, except for the 1970s.

In 1972, Madagascar’s foreign policy shifted dramatically after the downfall of the Tsiranana regime. President Ramanantsoa, revoking what he called the slavery agreements with the French, nationalized all French financial and insurance firms without compensation in June 1975. He further strengthened ties with the Soviet Union (in 1972) and North Korea, which contributed to a dramatic cooling of Malagasy–Turkey relations. 

The relations worsened when the Ramanantsoa regime suspended diplomatic relations with Israel, then Turkey’s closest ally in the Middle East and hosted an international conference on the North Korean ideology of Juche in Antananarivo in 1976. 

Relations improved in the 1980s when Madagascar aligned more closely with the West, especially after Madagascar dismantled the Soviet stations along Madagascar’s west coast along the Mozambique Channel.

Economic relations 
 Trade volume between the two countries was 76.5 million USD in 2019 (Turkish exports/imports: 71.3/5.2 million USD).

See also 

 Foreign relations of Madagascar
 Foreign relations of Turkey

References

Further reading 

 "L'attitude des églises malgaches face a la situation politique," Revue française d'etudes politiques africaines [Dakar, Senegal], 72, December 1971, pp. 85-89. 
 Althabe, Gerard. "Les manifestations paysannes d'avril 1971," Revue française d'etudes politiques africaines [Dakar, Senegal], 78, June 1972, pp. 70-77. 
 Andriamirado, Sennen. Madagascar aujourd'hui. Paris: Editions J.A., 1978. 
 Andriamparany, L.M., "Setting Up a Bibliographic Data-Base from National Inventory of Scientific and Technical Literature—The Cidst Experience in Madagascar," International Library Review, 23, No. 4, 1991, pp. 345-56. 
 Anizon, A. Production de I'habitat a Antananarivo. Paris: Harmattan, 1988. 
 Archer, Robert. Madagascar depuis 1972: La marche d'une revolution. Paris: Harmattan, 1976. 
 Attenborough, David, journeys to the Past: Travels in New Guinea, Madagascar, and the Northern Territory ofAustralia. Guildford, United Kingdom: Lutterworth Press, 1981. 
 Bare, J. F. Pouvoir des vivants, langage des morts: Ideologiques Sakalava. Paris: Francois Maspero, 1977. 
 Bavoux, Claude, and Claudine Bavoux. "Le cout social des dernieres politiques linguistiques," Politique africaine: Madagascar [Paris], 52, December 1993, pp. 76-88. 
 Brown, Mervyn. Madagascar Rediscovered: A History from Early Times to Independence. Hamden, Connecticut: Archon Books, 1979.
 Chaigneau, Pascal. Rivalités politiques et socialisme a Madagascar. Paris: CHEAM, 1985.Covell, Maureen. Madagascar: Politics, Economics, and Society. New York: Frances Pinter, 1987. 
 Deleris, Ferdinand. Ratsiraka: Socialisme et misère à Madagascar. Paris: Harmattan, 1986. 
 Deschamps, Hubert. Histoire de Madagascar. (4th ed.) Paris: Editions Berger-Levraut, 1972. 
 Durufle, Gilles. L'ajustement structurel en Afrique: Senegal, Cote d’ivoire, Madagascar. Paris: Karthala, 1988. 
 Ellis, Stephen D.K. Un complot colonial a Madagascar: L'affaire Rainandriamampandry. Paris: Karthala, 1990. 
 Jolly, Alison. Madagascar. Tarrytown, New York: Pergamon Press, 1984. 
 Kottak, Conrad P. Madagascar: Society and History. Durham: Carolina Academic Press, 2016. 
 Murphy, Dervla. Muddling Through in Madagascar. New York: Overlook Press, 1990.Pryor, Frederic L. Malawi and Madagascar. New York: Oxford University Press, 1990.Rabenoro, Cesaire. Les relations exterieures de Madagascar: De 1960 a 1992. Paris: Harmattan, 1996.

Turkey
Bilateral relations of Turkey